Navy Blues is a 1941 American musical comedy film directed by Lloyd Bacon and written by Jerry Wald, Richard Macaulay, Arthur T. Horman and Sam Perrin. The film stars Ann Sheridan, Jack Oakie, Martha Raye, Jack Haley, Herbert Anderson, Jack Carson, Jackie Gleason (in his screen debut) and William T. Orr. The film was released by Warner Bros. on September 13, 1941.

Plot
Margie Jordan and her friend Lilibelle Bolton arrive in Honolulu, Hawaii, much to the surprise of Lillibelle's former husband, Powerhouse Bolton, a sailor who is behind on the alimony he owes her.

In need of money, Powerhouse and his shipmate Cake O'Hara come up with a scheme. Learning that the crew is about to include Homer Matthews, a marksman, they make bets with practically everybody aboard on how a shooting competition will turn out. They are then stunned when it turns out Homer's going home, his service hitch being up before the contest.

Although he misses the family farm, Homer falls in love with Margie and wants to marry her but Powerhouse and Cake fib to him that Margie's only interested in his shooting skill. Homer re-enlists, wins the contest and wins Margie, too, while Lilibelle grabs the prize money before Powerhouse can.

Cast  
Ann Sheridan as Marge Jordan
Jack Oakie as Cake O'Hara
Jack Haley as Powerhouse Bolton
Herbert Anderson as Homer Matthews
Martha Raye as Lilibelle Bolton
Jack Carson as 'Buttons' Johnson
Jackie Gleason as Tubby 
William T. Orr as Mac
Richard Lane as 'Rocky' Anderson
John Ridgely as Jersey
Kay Aldridge as Navy Blues Sextette Member 
Georgia Carroll as Navy Blues Sextette Member
Marguerite Chapman as Navy Blues Sextette Member
Peggy Diggins as Navy Blues Sextette Member
Leslie Brooks as Navy Blues Sextette Member 
Claire James as Navy Blues Sextette Member

Production
Johnny Mercer wrote the song "Strip Polka" for use in the film, but film censor Joseph Breen objected to the moral tone of the lyrics, so the song was not used.

Box office
According to Warner Bros. records, the film earned $1,243,000 in the U.S. and $583,000 elsewhere.

References

External links 
 

1941 films
1941 musical comedy films
American black-and-white films
American musical comedy films
1940s English-language films
Films directed by Lloyd Bacon
Films produced by Jerry Wald
Warner Bros. films
1940s American films